Terr. or TERR may refer to:
Abbreviation for territory (subdivision)
TIBCO Enterprise Runtime for R, a runtime engine for the R programming language developed by TIBCO Software
short for terrorist, used by white Rhodesians for the insurgents during the Rhodesian Bush War
People with the surname Terr include:
Lenore Terr (born 1936), an American psychiatrist

See also